Wesley Charles Stevens (December 10, 1919 – December 25, 1994) was an American football and baseball coach. He served as the head football coach at Western Illinois University in Macomb, Illinois from 1954 to 1956, compiling a record of 17–8–4.  Stevens was also the head baseball coach at Kent State University from 1947 to 1948, tallying a mark of 18–14–1.

Head coaching record

Football

References

External links
 

1919 births
1994 deaths
American football tackles
Bates Bobcats football coaches
Case Western Spartans football coaches
Kent State Golden Flashes baseball coaches
Kent State Golden Flashes football coaches
Purdue Boilermakers football players
Western Illinois Leathernecks football coaches